Pinas Sarap is a Philippine television informative show broadcast by GMA News TV, GMA Network and GTV. Hosted by Kara David, it premiered on March 23, 2017. It moved to GMA Network on December 26, 2020 on the network's Sabado Star Power line up.

Premise
The show aims its audience to understand and learn more about Filipino food. Each episode showcases the history behind the featured local dish as well as the latest Filipino cuisine.

Production
The production was halted in March 2020 due to the enhanced community quarantine in Luzon caused by the COVID-19 pandemic. The show resumed its programming on November 10, 2020.

Accolades

References

External links
 
 

2017 Philippine television series debuts
Filipino-language television shows
GMA Network original programming
GMA Integrated News and Public Affairs shows
GMA News TV original programming
GTV (Philippine TV network) original programming
Philippine television shows
Television productions suspended due to the COVID-19 pandemic